Maria Izildinha "Zizi" Possi (born March 28, 1956) is a Brazilian singer from São Paulo, the daughter of Italian immigrants. She sings in Portuguese, English, and Italian. In 2007, she sang at the opening of the Military World Games, alongside Toquinho, Jorge Aragão, Alcione and the Paralamas do Sucesso band.

Possi is openly bisexual. She is the mother of another famous Brazilian singer, Luiza Possi.

Discography
All albums are in Portuguese unless noted otherwise.

1978 – Flor do Mal
1979 – Pedaço de Mim
1980 – Zizi Possi
1981 – Um Minuto Além
1982 – Asa Morena - Gold (100,000)
1983 – Pra Sempre e Mais um Dia
1984 – Dê um Rolê
1986 – Zizi - Gold (100,000)
1987 – Amor e Música
1989 – Estrebucha Baby
1991 – Sobre Todas as Coisas
1993 – Valsa Brasileira
1996 – Mais Simples
1997 – Per Amore – Italian - 3× Platinum (750,000)
1998 – Passione – Italian - Platinum (250,000)
1999 – Puro Prazer - Gold (100,000)
2001 – Bossa
2005 – Pra Inglês Ver... e Ouvir – English – live
2014 – Tudo Se Transformou  – live
DVDs
1998 – Per Amore (initially issued on VHS)
2005 – Pra Inglês Ver... e Ouvir
2010 – Cantos & Contos, Vol. 1
2010 – Cantos & Contos, Vol. 2

References

1956 births
Living people
Bisexual musicians
Bisexual women
Brazilian mezzo-sopranos
Brazilian people of Italian descent
Singers from São Paulo
Brazilian LGBT singers
Música Popular Brasileira singers
Italian-language singers
20th-century Brazilian women singers
20th-century Brazilian singers
Women in Latin music
LGBT people in Latin music